The 2011–12 Indiana Hoosiers men's basketball team represented Indiana University in the 2011–12 college basketball season. Their head coach was Tom Crean, in his fourth season with the Hoosiers. The team played its home games at Assembly Hall in Bloomington, Indiana, and was a member of the Big Ten Conference. They finished the season 27–9 overall and 11–7 in Big Ten play. They advanced to the second round of the 2012 Big Ten Conference men's basketball tournament before falling to Wisconsin. They received an at-large bid in the 2012 NCAA Division I men's basketball tournament where they advanced to the Sweet Sixteen before falling to eventual champion Kentucky.

Preseason

Coach Tom Crean signed a three-man class in 2011.

Season

On December 10, 2011, top-ranked Kentucky traveled to Bloomington to take on unranked Indiana. Indiana fans sensed a resurgence in the program and possible upset, with students lining up outside the arena 10 hours before tipoff to get good seats. The game remained close and hard-fought, with five lead changes in the final 121 seconds. At the last second, Christian Watford hit a 3-pointer, giving the Hoosiers a stunning 73–72 upset. Victor Oladipo had 13 points and five Hoosiers wound up in double figures. Watford's shot sent Indiana fans storming the court and crowding around players. Kentucky's loss was their only one of the regular season and prevented them from matching a record last set by Indiana's 1975–1976 team.

Video of Indiana fans reacting to the shot around the country went viral. ESPN commentator Dick Vitale, who was covering the game for the network, said it was the "best game of the year" and that "[t]he atmosphere there was unreal, as I felt the building shaking after Watford hit the shot." According to Bob Kravitz, the win marked "a day when Hoosier Hysteria was restored to something akin to its former glory."

On December 31, 2011, the Hoosiers knocked off 2nd ranked Ohio State and in doing so became the first IU team in history to knock off the top 2 team ranked teams in the same season. On February 28, 2012 they again beat a Top 5 team by beating No. 5 Michigan State, and became the first IU team since the undefeated 1975–76 team to beat 3 Top 5 teams in the same year. The Hoosiers earned a number four seed in the 2012 NCAA tournament and defeated New Mexico State in the second round. After defeating VCU in the third round, the Hoosiers however would go on to lose to eventual champion Kentucky in the Sweet Sixteen 102–90, as the Wildcats avenged their lone regular season loss.

Roster

Schedule

|-
!colspan=9| Exhibition

|-
!colspan=9| Regular Season

|-
!colspan=12| Big Ten Regular Season

|-
!colspan=9| Big Ten Conference tournament

|-
!colspan=9| 2012 NCAA tournament

Rankings

"The Movement"
The 2012 class consists of Yogi Ferrell, Hanner Perea, Jeremy Hollowell, Peter Jurkin, and Ron Patterson.

References

Indiana Hoosiers
Indiana Hoosiers men's basketball seasons
Indiana
2011 in sports in Indiana
2012 in sports in Indiana